The football tournament at the 1997 Southeast Asian Games was held from 5 to 18 October in Jakarta, Indonesia. All 10 Southeast Asian nations competed in the tournament.

Medal winners

Men's tournament

Participants

Group stage

Group A

Group B

Knockout stage

Semi-finals

Bronze medal match

Gold medal match

Winners

Final ranking

Women's tournament

Participants

Group stage

Group A

Group B

Knockout stages

Semi-finals

Bronze medal match

Gold medal match

Winners

Final ranking

References 
"South East Asian Games 1997 (Jakarta, Indonesia)". RSSSF.
Result at the Mirror Official Website

SoutheastGames
1997
Football at the Southeast Asian Games
1997 Southeast Asian Games events